The 10th New Zealand Parliament was a term of the Parliament of New Zealand. Elections for this term were held in 4 Māori electorates and 91 European electorates on 7 and 26 September 1887, respectively. A total of 95 MPs were elected. Parliament was prorogued in October 1890. During the term of this Parliament, two Ministries were in power.

Sessions

The 10th Parliament opened on 6 October 1887, following the 1887 general election. It sat for four sessions, and was prorogued on 3 October 1890.

Historical context
The Representation Act 1887 had major implication for the procedure of revising electoral boundaries. The revision task was transferred from committees formed by MPs to a permanent Representation Commission. The act specified that a country quota of 18% be applied to all designated districts that excluded boroughs with a population above 2,000 people, and that all electorates were to have the same nominal population within a tolerance of 750 people. It was also stipulated that electoral boundaries were to be reviewed after each New Zealand census.

In the 1887 electoral redistribution, although the Representation Commission was required through the Representation Act 1887 to maintain existing electorates "as far as possible", rapid population growth in the North Island required the transfer of three seats from the South Island to the north.
One former electorate, was recreated.

Political parties had not been established yet; this only happened after the 1890 election. Anyone attempting to form an administration thus had to win support directly from individual MPs. This made first forming, and then retaining a government difficult and challenging.

Ministries

The second Stout-Vogel Ministry had been in power since 3 September 1884 until 8 October 1887, just after the 1887 general election to determine the composition of the 10th Parliament. The fourth Atkinson Ministry, known as the Scarecrow Ministry, lasted for the remainder of the term until 24 January 1891.

Initial composition of the 10th Parliament
95 seats were created across the electorates.

Notes

References

10